Naveen Jindal (born 9 March 1970) is an Indian billionaire industrialist, and a former Member of Parliament, Lok Sabha  from Kurukshetra, Haryana in the 14th and 15th Lok Sabha. He currently serves as the Chairman of Jindal Steel and Power Limited and Chancellor of O. P. Jindal Global University.

He is an active campaigner for population stabilisation, women's empowerment, environmental conservation, health and education. As an acknowledgement of Jindal's donations to his alma mater, the University of Texas at Dallas renamed its School of Management to Naveen Jindal School of Management in 2011.

Background and personal life
Jindal was born in Hisar, Haryana, on 9 March 1970, youngest child of the late industrialist-philanthropist-politician Shri Om Prakash Jindal, former Minister of Power in the Government of Haryana, India, and his wife Smt Savitri Jindal who too was a minister in Haryana Government till 2014. Jindal studied at Campus School, CCS HAU and DPS Mathura Road before graduating in Commerce from Hans Raj College, Delhi University in 1990. He completed an MBA at the University of Texas at Dallas in 1992. He was the President of the Student Government and recipient of the Student Leader of the Year Award at the University of Texas at Dallas.

Naveen Jindal is the youngest child of Smt Savitri Jindal and late Om Prakash Jindal. His father was born into a farming family in Haryana's Hisar district, and became the founder of the steel and power conglomerate, the O.P. Jindal Group. O.P. Jindal stood for elections to the Haryana Legislative Assembly and won thrice in 1991, 2000 and 2005 and contested elections to the Lok Sabha from Haryana's Kurukshetra constituency in 1996 and won. O.P Jindal was serving as the Power Minister in the Haryana government when he died on 31 March 2005, in a helicopter crash at the age of 74.

Naveen's mother Savitri Jindal was a Minister in the Haryana Government and MLA from Hisar. She is the Chairperson Emeritus of Jindal Steel and Power Limited and JSW Steel.

Naveen is married to acclaimed Kuchipudi dancer and chairperson of National Bal Bhawan, Shallu Jindal , the daughter of Abhey Kumar Oswal -founder of Oswal Agro Mills and Oswal Greentech- and sister of Shael Oswal and Pankaj Oswal. The couple has two children, a son and a daughter.

Naveen has eight siblings: including Prithviraj Jindal, Sajjan Jindal and Ratan Jindal who are industrialists like him. Prithviraj Jindal is the Chairman (Non - Executive) of Jindal SAW Ltd. Sajjan is the Chairman of JSW Group. Ratan Jindal is the managing Director of Jindal Stainless Limited.

Right to display the National flag
Naveen Jindal is known as the man who won the right to display the National Flag on all days of the year for all Indians.

Jindal's struggle for the tricolour began in early 1992 when he hoisted a tricolour at his factory in Raigarh. The then Commissioner of Bilaspur objected to it on the ground that as per the Flag Code of India, a private citizen was not permitted to fly the Indian flag except on certain days. Jindal filed a petition before the High Court arguing that no law could forbid Indian citizens from flying the national flag and, furthermore, the Flag Code of India was only a set of executive instructions from the Government of India and therefore not law. While he went out to court against the objections of the government officials, he did not remove the flag from the factory and kept flying it with respect and dignity.

The High Court allowed the petition and held the Flag Code of India was not a valid restriction on the right to freedom of expression under Article 19 of the Indian Constitution. The High Court observed that, according to Article 19(2), the only valid limitations on this right were those that were contained in the statute. In cases concerning the regulation of the flying of the national flag, such limitations could be found in the Emblems and Names (Prevention of Improper Use) Act 1950 or the Prevention of Insults to National Honour Act 1971.

The Union of India filed an appeal against this decision to the Supreme Court on the basis that whether citizens were free to fly the national flag was a policy decision, and could not be subject to court interference.

Supreme Court was pleased to grant leave and stay the operation of the impugned judgment. The flag continued to fly as Jindal's lawyer said "it would not be contempt of court since the judgement had only been stayed".

The matter then came up for hearing before the Supreme Court which observed that prima facie they see no reason why citizens cannot express patriotism by displaying the national flag. The court also observed that restrictions on flying of the national flag only on certain days by private citizens seemed unsustainable.

The Supreme Court on 23 January 2004 dismissed the Civil Appeal No. 2920 of 1996 arising out of SLP No. 1888 of 1996 filed by the Union of India against the judgment and order dates 22 September 1995 of Delhi High Court and held that flying the national flag was a symbol of expression that came within the right to freedom of expression under Article 19(1)(a) of the Constitution.

Jindal has been strongly advocating to mark 23 January as the "National Flag Day". While India observes Armed Forces Flag Day on 7 December, it does not have a National Flag Day.

Business

Jindal Steel and Power
Jindal is the Chairman of Jindal Steel and Power Limited (formerly known as Jindal Strips Limited) which was a moderately performing enterprise when Jindal first took over its Raigarh and Raipur operations in 1993.  Today, JSPL operates an iron manufacturing plant in Raigarh, Chhattisgarh, and plants in Jharkhand and Odisha. The company has set up captive power plants using waste products from the sponge iron making process to generate power.

He has been ranked amongst Asia’s 25 Hottest People in Business by the Fortune Asia magazine for turning a struggling steel company into an Asian blue-chip giant. He has also been ranked as India’s Best CEO by Business Today based on a BT-INSEAD-HBR study of top value creators for the period 1995 to 2011. JSPL has been rated the Second Highest Value Creator in the world by the Boston Consulting Group (BCG) of USA.

Naveen Jindal set up the world's first coal-gasification based steelmaking plant at Angul, Odisha that uses the locally available high-ash coal and turns it into synthesis gas for steel making thus reducing the dependence on imported coke-rich coal. Jindal believes that coal gasification technology has immense potential for countries like India, where non-coking coal is abundantly available.
JSPL's coal gas-based steel tech became a case study at Harvard University.

Recently Union steel minister Ram Chandra Prasad Singh inaugurated Jindal Steel's 1.4 MTPA TMT rebar mill at its integrated complex in Odisha's Angul district.

Jindal Steel is expanding its Angul Plant capacity from 6 MTPA to 12MTPA and the company will achieve an overall 15 MTPA steelmaking capacity by 2025.

Coal Block Deallocation
In 2014, the Supreme Court of India in a surprise move cancelled the coal blocks allocated to Indian steel and Power companies that had been allocated through successive Governments at the Centre. Jindal's company too was affected as its coal blocks got cancelled and it has to pay the arbitrary retrospective levy. This led to a scenario where most of the private steel and power companies in India became Non Performing Assets.

Jindal's company JSPL saw a tough time with debt levels going to 50,000 crore rupees.

Turnaround
The company went from the second-highest wealth creator with a share price of Rs 700 to a debt-ridden one with its share price tumbling down to Rs 62. The company however scripted a turnaround and came back green. In 2022 March, its share price jumped to Rs 530.

Business India magazine wrote: "JSPL has placed a singular focus on sweating its assets, improving capacity utilisations and deleveraging. From a loss-making company to making a PAT of Rs7,500 crore is a big story."

Philanthropy

OP Jindal Global University 

Jindal founded the OP Jindal Global University (OPJGU or JGU) in 2009, in memory of his father, Mr. O.P. Jindal. Situated in Sonepat, Haryana, JGU has made significant progress towards achieving the goal through its nine schools; three research, capacity building and training institutes; and multiple research initiatives and centres. JGU is one of the few universities in Asia that maintains a 1:9 faculty-student ratio and appoints faculty members from India and different parts of the world with outstanding academic qualifications and experience. The Jindal Global Law School at JGU is India’s Number One Law School and among the top 100 in the world.

OP Jindal University, Chhattisgarh 
Jindal is also the Founder and Patron of the OP Jindal University, Chhattisgarh. It started as an engineering college in 2008 and in a span of 4years, OPJU became India’s first and only private university to offer courses in steelmaking, metallurgy and management. The University was awarded the ‘Best Private University in Chhattisgarh’ at The Progress Global Awards 2020.

Naveen Jindal School of Management 
Jindal completed his MBA from the School of Management, the University of Texas at Dallas. In 2011, Jindal made a very substantial donation to the same institution, and as a result of which, the School of Management was renamed "Naveen Jindal School of Management" the same year.
This recognition has also led to the establishment of the Naveen Jindal Institute for Indo-American Business Studies.

Philanthropy During Covid-19 Pandemic 
During the second wave of the Covid-19 pandemic, India witnessed a tragic and emergency situation as hospitals ran short of the sudden demand for liquid medical oxygen. With death looming all around, there was despair. The Indian steel industry came forward and decided to halt production and divert their stock of liquid medical oxygen to hospitals. 
Jindal's efforts coupled with his tweets of tankers leaving his plants came as messages of hope. His selfless act of handling the situation directly and sending Oxygen was lauded by all. Chief Ministers of several Indian states took to Twitter and thanked Jindal for his timely intervention that potentially saved thousands of lives.

He was also felicitated with AsiaOne Super 50 COVID-19 Commitment Award 2020-21.

Politics

Jindal's involvement in politics began in his student days. He was the President of the Student Government and recipient of the Student Leader of the Year Award at the University of Texas at Dallas. After completing his post-graduation in the US, Jindal returned to India and began managing his father's political affairs.

Member of Parliament
In 2004 he stood for elections from the Kurukshetra constituency in the north Indian state of Haryana on an Indian National Congress ticket. He defeated his nearest rival Abhay Singh Chautala by a margin of 130,000 votes. He was re-elected in the 2009 general elections. His focus as an MP has been on the problems of corruption, over-population, women's empowerment, environment, health and education. Jindal moved a private member bill in Lok Sabha for a comprehensive Food and Nutrition Security Scheme that paved the way for the Food Security Act. He lost the 2014 Lok Sabha election from Kurukshetra.

Parliamentary responsibilities & initiatives
 Member, Standing Committee on Home Affairs
 Member, Consultative Committee, Ministry of Defense
 Special Invitee, Consultative Committee, Ministry of Civil Aviation
 Convener, Parliamentary Forum on Children
 Executive Member, Indian Parliamentary Group
 Additional Member, Parliamentary Forum on Population & Health
 Member, Kurukshetra Development Board
 Sports Secretary, Constitution Club of India
 Convener, Sub-Committee on Modernisation of Prison Administration, Ministry of Home Affairs

Sports

Polo

Naveen Jindal is an active Polo player. He is the Captain and Patron of the Jindal Panther Polo Team. He started playing Polo 3 decades ago at the age of 18 and really got hooked on it. He started his own team in 1995 that has won various tournaments including the Indian Open, Indian Masters, Maharaja Hari Singh Memorial Cup, Maharaja Jiwaji Rao Scindia Cup and the Bhopal Pataudi Cup. He was declared the Most Valuable Player at the finals of Maharaja Jiwaji Rao Scindia Gold Cup 2019.

“I was always very fond of horses. When we moved to Delhi, I joined the President’s Estate Polo Club just to ride. I saw people playing polo and was fascinated by it. I started playing and got hooked," he said in an interview with Mint.

Shooting
Naveen Jindal is an accomplished skeet shooter. The Indian Shooting Team, under his captaincy, won a silver medal in the South Asian Federation Games, April 2004, in Pakistan. He has also represented the country in the Asian games held in Busan, South Korea in 2002. In 2003, he set a National record in skeet shooting which stays unmatched till today.

He was also a part of the Haryana shooting team that won the gold medal at the 54th National shooting Championship competition (Big Bore) in the civilian category held at Gurgaon in May 2011.

Sports medals
 Gold medal in the team skeet event for India at the Singapore Open Shooting Championship, 2007
 Silver medal in the team skeet event at the 9th South Asian Federation Games, Islamabad, Pakistan, 2004
 Bronze in the team event at the Singapore Shooting Invitation, 2003
 Silver in the team event at the Singapore Shooting Invitation, 2002

Recognitions
 Jindal has been conferred with the Justice P.N. Bhagwati Award in recognition of his outstanding contribution to legal education and corporate philanthropy. Instituted by the Capital Foundation, the award was presented by Dr. A.P.J. Abdul Kalam, former President of India, December 2011
 Ernst and Young Entrepreneur of the Year Award in the field of Energy and Infrastructure, 2010

References

Indian National Congress politicians
Living people
Rajasthani people
India MPs 2004–2009
India MPs 2009–2014
Delhi University alumni
University of Texas at Dallas alumni
1970 births
People from Hisar (city)
Lok Sabha members from Haryana
Shooters at the 2002 Asian Games
Indian male sport shooters
Coal block allocation scam
Corruption in Haryana
Sport shooters from Haryana
South Asian Games silver medalists for India
Asian Games competitors for India
South Asian Games medalists in shooting
Jindal family
Polo players from Rajasthan